Antrodiaetus is a genus of American and Japanese folding trapdoor spiders first described by Anton Ausserer in 1871. The name is a combination of the Greek "antrodiaitos" (αντροδιαιτος), meaning "living in caves", "antron" (αντρον), meaning "cave", and "diaita (διαιτα), meaning "way of life, dwelling".

Species
 the World Spider Catalog accepted the following species:
Antrodiaetus apachecus Coyle, 1971 — USA
Antrodiaetus ashlandensis Cokendolpher, Peck & Niwa, 2005 — USA
Antrodiaetus cerberus Coyle, 1971 — USA
Antrodiaetus coylei Cokendolpher, Peck & Niwa, 2005 — USA
Antrodiaetus effeminatus Cokendolpher, Peck & Niwa, 2005 — USA
Antrodiaetus hageni (Chamberlin, 1917) — USA
Antrodiaetus lincolnianus (Worley, 1928) — USA
Antrodiaetus metapacificus Cokendolpher, Peck & Niwa, 2005 — USA
Antrodiaetus microunicolor Hendrixson & Bond, 2005 — USA
Antrodiaetus montanus (Chamberlin & Ivie, 1935) — USA
Antrodiaetus occultus Coyle, 1971 — USA
Antrodiaetus pacificus (Simon, 1884) — USA
Antrodiaetus pugnax (Chamberlin, 1917) — USA
Antrodiaetus robustus (Simon, 1891) — USA
Antrodiaetus roretzi (L. Koch, 1878) — Japan
Antrodiaetus stygius Coyle, 1971 — USA
Antrodiaetus unicolor (Hentz, 1842) — USA
Antrodiaetus yesoensis (Uyemura, 1942) — Japan

References

Antrodiaetidae
Mygalomorphae genera
Spiders of Asia
Spiders of the United States
Taxa named by Anton Ausserer